Puppetoons is a series of animated puppet films made in Europe (1930s) and in the United States (1940s) by George Pal. They were made using replacement animation: using a series of different hand-carved wooden puppets (or puppet heads or limbs) for each frame in which the puppet moves or changes expression, rather than moving a single puppet, as is the case with most stop motion puppet animation. They were particuarly made from 1932-1948, in both Europe and the US.

History
The Puppetoons series of animated puppet films were made in Europe in the 1930s and in the United States in the 1940s. The series began when George Pal made an advertising film using "dancing" cigarettes in 1932, which led to a series of theatrical advertising shorts for Philips Radio in the Netherlands. This was followed by a series for Horlicks Malted Milk in England. These shorts have an art deco design, often reducing characters to simple geometric shapes.

Pal arrived in the U.S. in 1940, and produced more than 40 Puppetoons for Paramount Pictures between 1941 and 1947.

Seven Puppetoons received Academy Award nominations, including Rhythm in the Ranks (for the year 1941), Tulips Shall Grow (1942), The 500 Hats of Bartholomew Cubbins (1943), And To Think I Saw it On Mulberry Street (1944), Jasper and the Beanstalk (1945), John Henry and the Inky-Poo (1946) and Tubby the Tuba (1947).

The series ended due to rising production costs which had increased from US$18,000 per short in 1939 to almost US$50,000 following World War II. Paramount Pictures—Pal's distributor—objected to the cost. Per their suggestion, Pal went to produce sequences for feature films. In 1956, the Puppetoons as well as most of Paramount's shorts, were sold to television distributor U.M. & M. TV Corporation. National Telefilm Associates bought out U.M. & M. and continued to syndicate them in the 1950s and 1960s as "Madcap Models".

Pal also used the Puppetoon name and the general Puppetoon technique for miniature puppet characters in some of his live-action feature films, including The Great Rupert (1949), Tom Thumb (1958), and The Wonderful World of the Brothers Grimm (1963). In these films, the individual wooden figures were billed as The Puppetoons.

Technique
Puppetoon films used replacement animation with puppets. Using a series of different hand-carved wooden puppets (or puppet heads or limbs) for each frame in which the puppet moves or changes expression, rather than moving a single puppet. A typical Puppetoon required 9,000 individually carved and machined wooden figures or parts. Puppetoon animation is a type of replacement animation, which is itself a type of stop-motion animation. The puppets are rigid and static pieces; each is typically used in a single frame and then switched with a separate, near-duplicate puppet for the next frame. Thus puppetoon animation requires many separate figures. It is thus more analogous in a certain sense to cel animation than is traditional stop-motion: the characters are created from scratch for each frame (though in cel animation the creation process is simpler since the characters are drawn and painted, not sculpted).

Jasper
Some controversy exists in modern times, as the black character, Jasper, star of several Puppetoons in the 1940s is considered a stereotype today. The Jasper series of shorts relied on a small, consistent cast. The titular character was a playful pickaninny, his mother a protective mammy, Professor Scarecrow being a black scam artist, and the Blackbird serving as his fast-talking partner-in-crime. Pal described Jasper as the Huckleberry Finn of American folklore. Already in 1946, an article of the Hollywood Quarterly protested that the Jasper shorts presented a "razor-totin', ghost-haunted, chicken-stealin' concept of the American Negro".

A 1947 article in Ebony pointed out that George Pal was a European and not raised on racial prejudice: "To him there is nothing abusive about a Negro boy who likes to eat watermelons or gets scared when he goes past a haunted house". The article, though, pointed that this depiction touched on the stereotypes of Negroes being childish, eating nothing but molasses and watermelons, and being afraid of their own shadows.

Jasper's full name is Jasper Jefferson Lincoln Washington Hawkins.

At one point, Jasper's popularity was on par with Mickey Mouse's and Donald Duck's.

Legacy and preservation
In 1987, film producer-director-archivist Arnold Leibovit, a friend of George Pal, collected several Puppetoons and released them theatrically and to video as The Puppetoon Movie reintroducing them to contemporary audiences. A feature-length documentary on the life and films of George Pal followed. In 2020, The Puppetoon Movie Volume 2 was released on Blu-ray and DVD, featuring 17 shorts not included on any of the Puppetoon Movie releases and The Ship of the Ether.

The Academy Film Archive preserved several of the Puppetoons in 2009, including Jasper and the Beanstalk, John Henry and the Inky Poo, and Rhythm In the Ranks.

Filmography

European shorts
1932
 Tale of the Gloomy King
 Midnight

1934
 Radio Valve Revolution
 The Ship of the Ether

1935
 The Magic Atlas
 World's Greatest Show
 In Lamp Light Land
 Ali Baba and The Forty Thieves

1936
 Ether Symphony
 Charlie's World Cruise
 On Parade!

1937
 What Ho, She Bumps
 The Reddingsbrigade (a.k.a. Rescue Brigade)
 Philips Broadcast of 1938

1938
 South Seas Sweethearts
 The Ballet of Red Radio Valves
 Sky Pirates
 How An Advertising Poster Came About

1939
 Aladdin and the Magic Lamp
 The Sleeping Beauty
 Love on the Range
 Philips Cavalcade (a.k.a. Cavalcade of Music)
 The Queen Was In The Parlour

1940
 Friend in Need
 The Good Bear and The Bad Bear
 The Old Woman Who Lived in A Shoe

American shorts
1940
 Western Daze
 Dipsy Gypsy

1941
 Hoola Boola
 The Gay Knighties
 Rhythm in the Ranks
 The Sky Princess

1942
 Jasper and the Watermelons
 Mr. Strauss Takes a Walk
 Tulips Shall Grow
 Jasper and the Haunted House

1943
 Jasper and the Choo-Choo
 Bravo, Mr. Strauss
 The 500 Hats of Bartholomew Cubbins
 Jasper's Music Lesson
 The Truck That Flew
 The Little Broadcast
 Jasper Goes Fishing
 Goodnight Rusty

1944
 Package for Jasper
 A Hatful of Dreams
 Say Ah, Jasper
 Jasper Goes Hunting
 And to Think That I Saw It on Mulberry Street
 Jasper's Paradise
 Two-Gun Rusty

1945
 Jasper's Booby Traps
 Hot Lips Jasper
 Jasper Tell
 Jasper's Minstrels
 Jasper's Close Shave
 Jasper and the Beanstalk
 My Man Jasper

1946
 Jasper's Derby
 Jasper in a Jam
 Olio for Jasper
 Together in the Weather
 John Henry and the Inky-Poo
 Wilbur the Lion

1947
 Shoe Shine Jasper
 Date with Duke (featuring Duke Ellington) - October 31, 1947
 Rhapsody in Wood (featuring Woody Herman)
 Tubby the Tuba
 Romeow and Julicat (shown in the film Variety Girl)

1948
 Sweet Pacific

1971
 The Tool Box (broadcast on Curiosity Shop) - September 2, 1971

Australian shorts
1962
 Wambidgee

Cancelled projects
 Casey Jones
 Davy Crockett
 Gulliver's Travels
 Johnny Appleseed
 Sinbad
 Three Little Princes

See also
 The Puppetoon Movie

Sources

References

External links
 The George Pal Puppetoon site
 George Pal's Puppetoons at Don Markstein's Toonopedia. Archived from the original on August 24, 2016.
 
 

 
Animated film series
American film series
Short film series
Film series introduced in 1932
Film series introduced in 1940
Puppet films
 
1930s stop-motion animated films
 
1940s stop-motion animated films